The 2021–22 season was FC Ararat Yerevan's 31st consecutive season in Armenian Premier League, whilst they will also compete in the Armenian Cup and the UEFA Europa Conference League.

Season events
On 18 June, Ararat Yerevan announced the signing of Arsen Sadoyan from Urartu.

On 21 June, Ararat Yerevan announced the signing of Erik Vardanyan from Urartu, and Alik Arakelyan from Pyunik.

On 29 June, Ararat Yerevan announced the signing of Gor Malakyan from Pyunik, with Robert Darbinyan also joining from Pyunik the following day.

On 2 July, Ararat Yerevan announced the signing of Serges Déblé from Viborg.

On 22 July, Ararat Yerevan announced the signing of Isah Aliyu from Urartu.

On 26 July, Ararat Yerevan announced the signing of Iván Díaz from Sereď.

On 1 August, Ararat Yerevan announced that Karen Muradyan had left the club after his contract had expired.

On 25 September, Christian Ouguehi, Armand Dagrou, Sery Narcisse, Sosthène Tiehide and Amara Traoré all joined Ararat Yerevan from RC Abidjan.

On 11 January, Head Coach Vardan Bichakhchyan left Ararat Yerevan by mutual consent.

On 14 January, Ararat Yerevan terminated their contracts with Yacouba Silue and Serges Déblé by mutual consent.

On 25 January, Edgar Torosyan was appointed as Head Coach of Ararat Yerevan.

Squad

Transfers

In

Out

Loans out

Released

Friendlies

Competitions

Overall record

Supercup

Premier League

Results summary

Results by round

Results

Table

Armenian Cup

UEFA Europa Conference League

Qualifying rounds

Statistics

Appearances and goals

|-
|colspan="16"|Players away on loan:
|-
|colspan="16"|Players who left Ararat Yerevan during the season:

|}

Goal scorers

Clean sheets

Disciplinary record

References

FC Ararat Yerevan seasons
Ararat Yerevan
Ararat Yerevan